Chen Qiufan (born 1981), also known as Stanley Chan, is a Chinese science fiction writer, columnist, and scriptwriter. His first novel was The Waste Tide, which "combines realism with allegory to present the hybridity of humans and machines".
Chen Qiufan's short fiction works have won three Galaxy Awards for Chinese Science Fiction, twelve Nebula Awards for Science Fiction and Fantasy in Chinese. "The Fish of Lijiang" received the Best Short Form Award for the 2012 Science Fiction & Fantasy Translation Awards. His stories have been published in Fantasy & Science Fiction, MIT Technology Review, Clarkesworld, Year's Best SF, Interzone, and Lightspeed, as well as influential Chinese science fiction magazine Science Fiction World. His works have been translated into German, French, Finnish, Korean, Czech, Italian, Japanese and Polish and other languages.

Early life
Chen was born in Shantou, Guangdong, China in 1981.

He graduated from Peking University in 2004 with dual bachelor's degrees in literature and fine arts, and pursued graduate studies in the Integrated Marketing Communications (IMC) program of Hong Kong University and Tsinghua University. He later worked for Baidu and Google China. In 2017, Chen quit his job to write full-time.

Writing style
Chen's fiction, described as "science fiction realism", focuses on the internal struggles of individuals during times of accelerated change.

Chen has become known for his use of AI-generated content in his stories. His story, "State of Trance," which appeared in Book of Shanghai, a 2020 short story collection, used automatically generated paragraphs based on his own writing. That story won him a literary prize in a contest moderated by an AI judge, over Nobel laureate Mo Yan. He is currently working on a six-story collection about the relationship between humans and artificial intelligence. Chen's collaboration with Kai-Fu Lee, AI 2041: Ten Visions for Our Future, was published in September, 2021.

Selected works 
Novels
 The Waste Tide (荒潮, 2013 in Chinese, translated by Ken Liu and published in English by Tor & Head of Zeus in 2019, Turkish edition was published in 2021. German, Spanish, Japanese, Russian editions are forthcoming)
Short stories
 "The Tomb", 坟 (2004)
 "The Fish of Lijiang", 丽江的鱼儿们 (2006)
 "The Year of the Rat", 鼠年 (2009)
 "The Smog Society", 霾 (2010)
 "The Endless Farewell", 无尽的告别 (2011)
 "The Mao Ghost", 猫的灵魂 (2012)
 "The Flower of Shazui", 沙嘴之花 (2012)
 "The Animal Watcher" 动物观察者 (2012)
 " A History of Future Illnesses", 未来病史 (2012)
 "Oil Of Angel", 天使之油 (2013)
 "Balin", 巴鳞 (2015)
 "Coming of the light", 开光 (2015, offline 2012)

References

External links 

 
 
 Chen Qiufan at the Internet Speculative Fiction Database

1981 births
Living people
Chinese science fiction writers
Writers from Shantou
Peking University alumni
Baidu people
Google people
Chinese male novelists